Water Me may refer to:

"Water Me" (Bonnie Pink song), 2007
"Water Me" (FKA Twigs song), 2013
"Water Me" (Lizzo song), 2017